is a village located in Kuma District, Kumamoto Prefecture, Japan.

As of March 2017, the village has an estimated population of 4,598 and a population density of 49 persons per km². The total area is 94.54 km².

References

External links

Sagara official website 

Villages in Kumamoto Prefecture